Lucie Schlimé (born 19 September 2003) is a Luxembourger footballer who plays as a goalkeeper for Dames Ligue 1 club FC CeBra 01 and the Luxembourg women's national team.

International career
Schlimé made her senior debut for Luxembourg on 9 November 2019 during a 0–5 friendly loss to Kosovo.

References

2003 births
Living people
Women's association football goalkeepers
Luxembourgian women's footballers
Luxembourg women's international footballers